The 2021–22 Linafoot was the 61st season of the Linafoot, the top-tier football league in the Democratic Republic of the Congo, since its establishment in 1958. Following the long interruption between 9 March and 29 May 2022, due to the clubs transport difficulties, the second half of the season was canceled.

Teams 
Twenty teams are compete in this season: the top 16 teams from the previous season and four promoted teams from the 2020–21 Linafoot Ligue 2 – US Panda B52, AS Kuya Sport, Etoile de Kivu, US Tshinkunku

Stadiums and locations

League table 
As of February 23, 2022

References

External links 
 Official website

Linafoot seasons
Congo DR